SMS Eber, a 735-ton iron-hulled gunboat, was built at Kiel, Germany for gunboat diplomacy in the Pacific. It was a barque-rigged auxiliary steamer. After commissioning in September 1887 she was sent to the Pacific to serve in the German colonial empire. She disarmed the inhabitants of Nauru in 1888, ending their civil war and annexing the island to the German Empire.  Eber was anchored in Apia Harbor, Samoa, during the 1889 Apia cyclone of 15–16 March 1889. Though she was the most modern of the seven warships present, damage to her propeller made it impossible for her to survive the violent wind and seas. After a long struggle, Eber was forced against the edge of the harbor reef and sank quickly, with the loss of 73 of her crewmen.

See also
 Naruan Tribal War

References

Further reading

Gunboats of the Imperial German Navy
Shipwrecks of Samoa
Maritime incidents in March 1889
1887 ships
Ships built in Kiel